Kenneth Lawrence Barham  (called Ken; born 1936) is a retired Anglican bishop.

Barham was born in 1936, a son of Lawrence Barham (second Bishop of Rwanda and Burundi, 1964–1966) and Julia née Leakey. He married Jill, a teacher. Like his father, Barham became an Anglican priest and later bishop: he trained at Clifton Theological College, gaining his Bachelor of Divinity (BD) in 1963.

Ordained a deacon at Michaelmas (29 September) 1963 and a priest at Michaelmas (20 September) 1964 (both times by Roger Wilson, Bishop of Chichester in Chichester Cathedral), he served curacies in Worthing, Sevenoaks and Cheltenham. His first incumbency was as vicar of Maidstone, from 1970 until 1979, when he became the South Area Secretary for the CMS Rwanda mission, until 1984. He returned to parochial ministry as priest-in-charge of Ashburnham and Penhurst until 2001. During this time, however, he also held posts in the Province of the Anglican Church of Rwanda.

Among those colonial mission posts, Barham was consecrated in 1993 as Assistant Bishop of Cyangugu, becoming diocesan Bishop of Cyangugu in 1996 until his 2001 retirement. In 2001, he was made an Officer of the Order of the British Empire (OBE) and retired to Sussex; where he has served the Diocese of Chichester as an honorary assistant bishop since 2005.

In 2004 the then Archbishop of Canterbury, Rowan Williams, awarded Barham the Cross of St Augustine in recognition of his work for the Anglican Communion.

References

1936 births
20th-century Anglican bishops in Africa
Living people
Officers of the Order of the British Empire
Place of birth missing (living people)
Recipients of the Cross of St Augustine
People from Ashburnham, East Sussex
Anglican bishops of Cyangugu